Namakzar (Persian: نمکزار; meaning "salt lake") may refer to: 
Namakzar-e Shahdad
Namakzar-e Nalak
Chah-e Namakzar
Daghal-e Namakzar
Kowl-e Namakzar
Rud-e Namakzar

See also
Namak (disambiguation)